Scalinata di Santa Maria del Monte is a set of world-famous steps in Caltagirone, Sicily, Italy. It was built in 1606 in order to connect the ancient part of Caltagirone to the new city built in the upper part.

The city of Caltagirone is part of Late Baroque Towns of the Val di Noto, a UNESCO World Heritage Site since 2002.

History

In the middle of the XV century, the city of Caltagirone expanded through the slopes of the mountain. The expansion of the city, on different levels, made communication between the areas of the city difficult.

In order to facilitate access to the old town, located at the top, the city authorities ordered the construction, in 1606, of a staircase along the southern slope of the hill. The work required 10 years of work and was carried out under the direction of Giuseppe Giacalone. The original staircase had rest areas and a total of 150 steps.

In 1844, the staircase underwent modifications, among which the elimination of rest areas stands out, which results in a lower inclination.

The steps

Since 1954, the steps leading to the church of Santa Maria del Monte have been entirely decorated with polychrome ceramic tiles, following the ancient local artisan tradition.

The figurative themes of the ceramics are floral or geometric, and represent the Arab, Norman, Angevin-Aragonese, Spanish, Renaissance, Baroque, eighteenth-century, nineteenth-century and contemporary styles.

Festivities

Infiorata 
During the month of May, the "Flower Festival" is held, dedicated to the Virgin Mary. Thousands of flowers are used as decorations, along the stairs.

La Scala Illuminata 
Every year, during the days 24 and 25 of July, and 14 and 15 of August, the staircase is illuminated with 4000 oil lamps, in honor of the patron saint of Caltagirone, Saint James the Great. The celebration attracts thousands of tourists.

References

Buildings and structures completed in 1606
Buildings and structures in Caltagirone
Stairways